Three-time defending champion Esther Vergeer defeated Korie Homan in the final, 6–0, 6–0 to win the women's singles wheelchair tennis title at the 2009 US Open.

The event was not held in 2008 due to a schedule conflict with the 2008 Summer Paralympics, an issue that would continue to affect US Open wheelchair tennis until 2021.

Seeds

 Esther Vergeer (champion)
 Korie Homan (final)

Draw

Finals

External links
Main Draw

Wheelchair Women's Singles
U.S. Open, 2009 Women's Singles